The 2019 DTM Lausitz round was a motor racing event for the Deutsche Tourenwagen Masters (DTM) held between 24 and 25 August 2019. The event, part of the 33rd season of the DTM, was held at the Lausitzring in Germany.

Race 2 of the weekend marked the 500th race in the history of the DTM. Audi secured the manufacturers' championship with two events remaining.

Results

Race 1

Qualifying

Race

Race 2

Qualifying

Race

Championship standings

Drivers Championship

Teams Championship

Manufacturers Championship

 Note: Only the top five positions are included for three sets of standings.

References

External links
Official website

|- style="text-align:center"
|width="35%"|Previous race:
|width="30%"|Deutsche Tourenwagen Masters2019 season
|width="40%"|Next race:

Lausitzring DTM
DTM Lausitz